Ericek is a village in the District of Buharkent, Aydın Province, Turkey. As of 2010 it had a population of 258 people.

References

Villages in Buharkent District